Garuda Rekhe (Kannada: ಗರುಡ ರೇಖೆ) is a 1982 Indian Kannada film,  directed by  P. S. Prakash and produced by G. S. Vasu, P. Sheshaiah, B. Manmatha Rao, M. Shivaji Rao, N. M. Victor and P. Venkata Reddy. The film stars Srinath, Ambika, Madhavi, Hema Chowdhary and Vajramuni in the lead roles. The film has musical score by Sathyam.

Cast

Srinath
Madhavi
Ambika
Tiger Prabhakar
Vajramuni
Hema Choudhary
K. Vijaya
Thoogudeepa Srinivas
Dinesh
Shakti Prasad
Shashikala
Master Rohith
Lakshman
Jr. Narasimharaju
Rathnakar

References

1982 films
1980s Kannada-language films
Films scored by Satyam (composer)